United Nations Security Council Resolution 259, adopted on September 27, 1968, concerned with the welfare of the inhabitants of the Arab territories then occupied by Israel after the Six-Day War, the Council requested the Secretary-General send a Special Representative to report on the implementation of resolution 237.  The Council requested that Israel receive and co-operate with the Special Representative and that the Secretary-General should be afforded all co-operation in order to implement the present resolution.

The resolution was passed with 12 votes to none; Canada, Denmark and the United States abstained.

See also
Arab–Israeli conflict
List of United Nations Security Council Resolutions 201 to 300 (1965–1971)

References
Text of the Resolution at undocs.org

External links
 

 0259
 0259
 0259
September 1968 events